Hometown is an American comedy-drama television series that ran on CBS from August 22 to October 15, 1985. The series was a loose adaptation of the 1983 movie The Big Chill, and centered on the same premise as the film: a group of friends all in their 30s, who had reunited after traveling separate paths following their college days in the 1960s. Upon their reunion, they found that they were even more so an integral part of each other's lives in the 1980s. Julie and Dinah Kirgo served as executive producers, with Barnet Kellman directing most of the episodes. Hometown was produced by Kirgette Productions in association with Paramount Television.

Synopsis
Set in Rye, New York, Hometown opened with the reunion of the seven former college friends, that took place at the wedding of two of them, the longtime couple of Mary Newell (Jane Kaczmarek) and Ben Abbott (Franc Luz). Amid all the nostalgia of radical times and the reminiscing of their youth, the group found their unwavering network of support was more important than ever, as they faced a more conservative, Reaganized America of the 1980s. Prior to the wedding, Mary and Ben had been living together for 13 years, had started a family of their own out of wedlock, and now were a modern yuppie couple raising young daughters Jennifer (Erin Leigh Peck) and Tess (Donna Vivino). Ben was a successful businessman, running a local bookstore in the city square, and Mary was on the heels of relaunching her long-abandoned dancing career.

All other series principals besides the Newell/Abbott family had now either re-established their ties with the town they all attended college in, or had remained there since college and had not seen their other friends in years. The most internationally known member of the group was Christopher Springer (Andrew Rubin), the wealthy rock star who had a troubled personal life (modeled after Bruce Springsteen). Chris decided to come back to his old hometown to regain the support from his old friends and to repair his problems, while intermittently going back on the road with his band. Completing the circle was Peter Kincaid (John Bedford Lloyd), a quirky college professor; elegant, recent divorcee Barbara Donnelly (Margaret Whitton), who currently lived off her vast settlements yet was insecure about moving on with her life and reentering the dating world; Jane Parnell (Christine Estabrook), also a college professor, but in addition serving as a presidential advisor to the White House; and Joey Nathan (Daniel Stern), who was more disheveled and less successful than his materialistic friends.

In the intervening years, Joey had settled into the job of a fry cook, and always proved to the gang that he was quite happy with his modest means. Joey was a single parent, raising young son Dylan (Mikey Viso), and at one point his paternity was even in question when Dylan's mother, Joey's ex-girlfriend, showed up with a DNA test. Joey's ex wanted to know who Dylan's father really was, so that if the results proved that someone else was in the picture, she could then possibly give her son a more suitable upbringing than what Joey could provide. In the ninth episode, Ben began his lobbying to run for city council, but nothing more of this development was explored, along with other plot twists, as Hometown was pulled from the CBS schedule permanently after that telecast.

Hometown was filmed in Rye, New York.

Cast
Jane Kaczmarek as Mary Newell Abbott
Franc Luz as Ben Abbott
Christine Estabrook as Jane Parnell 
Andrew Rubin as Christopher Springer
Margaret Whitton as Barbara Donnelly
John Bedford Lloyd as Peter Kincaid
Donna Vivino as Tess Abbott 
Daniel Stern as Joey Nathan

Episodes

Scheduling
In an attempt to ensure that the show would find an audience, CBS premiered Hometown just under a month before the official start of the 1985-86 TV season. They immediately ran it in the time slot it was slated to have on the fall schedule, Thursdays at 10/9c. However, by the time of CBS' premiere week in mid-September, the show's ratings were unsatisfactory, resulting in Hometown moving to Tuesdays at 8/7c as of September 24; thus, the show had already failed in its fall schedule slot before the season itself had already begun. The new night and earlier hour for Hometown did little to boost the ratings, so in mid-October, CBS cancelled the series. All nine completed episodes aired on the network before cancellation.

References
Brooks, Tim and Marsh, Earle, The Complete Directory to Prime Time Network and Cable TV Shows

External links

1985 American television series debuts
1985 American television series endings
1980s American comedy-drama television series
CBS original programming
Television series by CBS Studios
English-language television shows